The 2002 West Oxfordshire District Council election took place on 2 May 2002 to elect members of West Oxfordshire District Council in Oxfordshire, England. The whole council was up for election with boundary changes since the last election in 2000. The Conservative Party stayed in overall control of the council.

Background
Before the election the Conservatives had a two-seat majority with 25 councillors, while the Liberal Democrats had 12 seats, Independents had nine, the Labour Party had two seats and one seat was vacant. Boundary changes took place for the 2002 election with the whole council being elected for the first time since 1976. Only seven wards had no boundary change and the number of councillors for Witney increased from 9 to 12.

A total of 108 candidates stood for the 49 seats on the council, 46 Conservatives, 27 Liberal Democrats, 18 Labour, 10 Independents, 6 Green Party and 1 United Kingdom Independence Party. 39 councillors sought re-election, with the Conservative group leader Barry Norton being re-elected in North Leigh without opposition.

Election result
The Conservative majority on the council increased to 15, after 32 Conservative councillors were elected. 35 of the 39 councillors who sought election were re-elected, with the Liberal Democrats taking 10 seats, independents 5 seats and Labour kept the 2 seats they had been defending. The Green Party failed to win any seats, with 324 votes in fourth place in Witney North being their best result. Overall turnout at the election was 39%.

Ward results

References

2002 English local elections
2002
2000s in Oxfordshire